Mark Daniel Milligan (born 4 August 1985) is an Australian former professional footballer. Starting his career as a defender, Milligan has spent much of his later career playing as a midfielder. He is currently a football expert commentary and analysis at 10 Sport. He is currently an assistant coach for A-League Men club Adelaide United.
He attended Trinity catholic college

Club career

Early career
FourFourTwo magazine revealed on 28 July 2007 that after the Asian Cup Milligan had gone without Sydney FC's permission to trial for teams in Europe.  Milligan was linked with French sides FC Metz and RC Lens. The following day Milligan reportedly walked out on Metz just before a scheduled trial game appearance against Standard Liège, allegedly out of frustration at the right-back position he would be trialled in. The following day it was reported that Milligan would return home to play for Sydney FC after all.

During the summer of 2008, he was linked with a move to English Premier League clubs Blackburn Rovers, Manchester City and Arsenal, RC Lens of Ligue 1, as well as with FC Porto in the Primeira Liga and Bundesliga side Werder Bremen.

On 21 October 2008, The Sydney Morning Herald reported that Milligan had signed a guest contract with Newcastle United Jets for seven weeks. He made his debut on 24 October 2008, against Central Coast Mariners at Bluetongue Stadium, Gosford, where his team lost 1–0. During this time he was also sent off in a match against the Wellington Phoenix.

Asia
Milligan joined Chinese Super League outfit Shanghai Shenhua in January 2009, signing a three-year contract.

On 19 May, Milligan scored his first goal for Shanghai Shenhua in their 1–1 draw in the AFC Champions League group stage match against Kashima Antlers.

Milligan finalised his switch from Chinese side Shanghai Shenhua to Japanese side JEF United Chiba, who were relegated to the second division.

When the 2011 Tōhoku earthquake and tsunami struck Japan, Milligan decided to flee the country, fearing for the safety of not only himself, but his wife and child. With the J2 League suspended until further notice, JEF United Chiba gave permission for Milligan to train in a bid to keep his fitness up with his former A-League club Sydney FC.

Melbourne Victory

On 23 January 2012 it was reported that Melbourne Victory was to secure Milligan on loan until the end of the regular season. It was confirmed on 24 January that Milligan signed for a loan deal to Melbourne Victory until the end of the 2011–12 A-League season, becoming the first Sydney FC player to switch to Melbourne Victory. He returned to Japan in March. In July 2012, Milligan was released from JEF United Chiba and returned to Melbourne Victory by signing a three-year contract.

Milligan starred for Melbourne Victory during their 2012–13 season, moving from centre-back to play as a defensive midfielder, and quickly established himself as one of the best players in the league. Although he has never been a prolific goal scorer, Milligan scored 8 goals in this season, a number of them being clutch goals in important games, including a penalty equaliser in an elimination final against Perth Glory that Melbourne Victory went on to win in extra time. To cap off his season, Milligan won the Victory Medal, awarded to the club's player of the season.

On 17 September 2013, Milligan was rewarded for his performances by being appointed the captain of Melbourne Victory, replacing Adrian Leijer. He was also rumoured to be leaving Melbourne Victory to join fellow national team midfielder Mile Jedinak at newly promoted Premier League club Crystal Palace, however Melbourne Victory rejected a rumoured £2m offer for the defensive midfielder.

Milligan, after a trial at Crystal Palace, stayed on at Melbourne Victory as captain in the 2013–14 season. He sustained an injury halfway through the season, and the team suffered for this and other reasons such as losing their coach, an injury to Adrian Leijer (ex-captain and central defender) and four players (including three defenders) going to the Under 21 World championships (Jason Geria, Connor Pain, Scott Galloway and Nick Ansell). However, Victory improved after this period to finish fourth in the A-League. Milligan played every minute of all but one ACL match, only missing the final away match of the ACL Asian Champions League match through suspension.

On 17 May 2015, Milligan captained his side during their 3–0 defeat of Sydney FC in the 2014–15 A-League Grand Final, held at AAMI Park, Melbourne, and was awarded the Joe Marston Medal as the best player in the match.

Baniyas SC
At the end of the 2014–15 season it was announced that UAE Pro-League side Baniyas SC had triggered the release clause of Milligan's contract with a $1 million transfer fee, and he signed with them on a two-year contract.

Return to the Victory
On 31 July 2017, it was announced Miligan would return to the Victory on a one-year deal as a marquee player.

Al Ahli
On 28 January 2018, Melbourne Victory sold Mark Milligan to Al-Ahli for $1 million. He was assigned the number 5 shirt. On 4 February, he made his debut for Al-Ahli in a league game against Al Ittihad FC. He played at centre-half, with the game finishing 0-0. He got good response from the fans, playing the full 90 minutes in the Jeddah derby.

Hibernian
On 18 August 2018, Milligan signed a two-year contract with Scottish Premiership club Hibernian. Milligan played regularly for Hibernian during the 2018–19 season, after which he left the club. Hibernian head coach Paul Heckingbottom said that he had opted to exercise a break clause in Milligan's contract as he wanted to "recruit something different to play in that position".

Southend United
On 1 July 2019, Milligan signed for Southend United. Milligan was released by Southend United on 19 June 2020, after the team's relegation from League One.

Macarthur FC
On 30 July 2020, following his release from Southend, Milligan returned home to Australia to join newly formed A-League club Macarthur FC, signing a two-year deal. On 22 October, he was named the club's captain for their inaugural campaign in the A-League. In the club's first match, a local derby against Western Sydney Wanderers on 30 December, Milligan scored the club's first goal which secured a first-ever win.

On 2 June 2021, Milligan announced that he would be retiring from football at the end of the 2020–21 season and would join the coaching staff at Macarthur.

International career

Milligan represented Australia at the 2005 FIFA World Youth Championship in the Netherlands. In May 2006, he was the youngest player selected in the Australian 2006 FIFA World Cup squad, being one of only two players chosen from the A-League – the other being Michael Beauchamp. Milligan had impressed coaches Graham Arnold and Johan Neeskens at a recent camp in Vietnam, while Guus Hiddink also recalled watching Milligan at the World Youth Championship.

He made his senior international debut against Liechtenstein on 7 June 2006, coming off the bench in the 85th minute of Australia's last warm-up game before the World Cup. He did not play in any of Australia's four World Cup games in Germany. His first start came against Kuwait in an Asian Cup qualifier on 16 August 2006. His next appearance was on 7 October 2006 in a friendly against Paraguay as a late substitute.

In February 2007, Milligan was named as captain of the Australian U-23 side, the 'Olyroos', for two Olympic qualifying games against Chinese Taipei. He sustained a broken nose in an 'off-the-ball' incident during the second qualifier. He led the Olyroos to Olympic qualification and was the key influential figure in their final games against Iraq and North Korea, scoring in each game and taking the man of the match award in both.

Milligan was selected in the Australian squad for the 2007 Asian Cup. During the tournament, Milligan was selected to play in the starting line-up for Australia against co-host nation Thailand in the final game of the group matches. Australia won 4–0 and advanced to the quarter finals of the competition with Milligan putting in what was widely regarded as a Man of the Match performance in the centre of a three-man defence. On 21 July 2007, in the quarter-final against Japan, Milligan was unfortunate in failing to clear a ball from the penalty area that saw striker Naohiro Takahara pounce and score an equaliser. The game ended 1–1 and Australia was eliminated from the Cup on penalties.

Milligan scored his first international goal for the Socceroos against Indonesia in a 2011 Asian Cup Qualifiers played at Suncorp Stadium in Brisbane. This being the only goal in the match with Australia winning 1–0 and then qualifying for the 2011 competition.

He was named in the 31 man squad named by Pim Verbeek for the 2010 FIFA World Cup in South Africa. His 2010 FIFA World Cup profile described him as "[a] mobile defender with good ball skills and an ability to play a raking pass."

Milligan was selected for the 30-man preliminary 2014 FIFA World Cup squad, alongside seven other A-League players. Three from Melbourne Victory (Milligan, James Troisi & Tom Rogic) were among the final selection.  He played alongside James Troisi and captain Mile Jedinak in a three-man midfield in the Socceroos warm-up match vs Croatia. He played only one game in the 2014 World Cup, a 3–1 defeat against Chile in their opening match.

In 2015, he was a key member of Australia who won the 2015 AFC Asian Cup. He didn't play in the opening game. After this game, he played in all the next 5 matches, including the final against South Korea. In the second game, he scored the goal against Oman national football team. Australia won the match by 4-0. After the Asian Cup success, he played 7 games out of 8 in second round of 2018 FIFA World Cup Qualification. He scored his fourth and fifth international goals against Tajikistan.

Milligan captained Australia at the 2017 FIFA Confederations Cup, and scored from the penalty spot in the 60th minute in a 1-1 draw against Cameroon.

In the third round of qualification, he played 8 games out of 10. Australia finished third in the table and  failed to qualify directly to the World Cup. He played on the winning side in the two-leg tie Asian play-off against Syria. The match ended 3-2 on aggregate after extra time. He also played in the second leg game of 2018 FIFA World Cup qualification (CONCACAF–AFC play-off) against Honduras. This was the match which decided the last spot of 2018 FIFA World Cup. The match ended in favour of Australia by 3-1. With that, Australia qualified in the World Cup finals for the fourth time in a row. In May 2018 he was named in Australia's 23-man squad for the 2018 FIFA World Cup in Russia. Milligan played in central defence during the tournament, alongside Trent Sainsbury.

Milligan captained Australia at the 2019 AFC Asian Cup, in which they were knocked out at the quarter-final stage.

He retired from international football in December 2019.

Career statistics

Club

International
Statistics accurate as of match played 10 October 2019.

Scores and results list Australia's goal tally first.

Honours
Sydney FC
 A-League Championship: 2005–06
 Australian Club World Championship Qualifying Tournament: 2005

Melbourne Victory
 A-League Championship: 2014–15
 A-League Premiership: 2014–15
Australia
 AFC Asian Cup: 2015
 OFC U-20 Championship: 2005
Individual
 A-League PFA Team of the Season: 2012–13, 2013–14, 2014–15
 A-League PFA Team of the Decade: 2005–15
 Melbourne Victory FC Player of the Season: 2012–13
 Joe Marston Medal: 2015

References

External links

1985 births
Living people
Australian soccer players
Australia international soccer players
Sutherland Sharks FC players
Northern Spirit FC players
Blacktown City FC players
Sydney FC players
Newcastle Jets FC players
Shanghai Shenhua F.C. players
JEF United Chiba players
Melbourne Victory FC players
Baniyas Club players
Al-Ahli Saudi FC players
Hibernian F.C. players
Southend United F.C. players
Macarthur FC players
A-League Men players
J2 League players
Chinese Super League players
English Football League players
Australian Institute of Sport soccer players
Soccer players from Sydney
UAE Pro League players
Saudi Professional League players
AFC Asian Cup-winning players
Association football midfielders
Association football central defenders
Association football utility players
Olympic soccer players of Australia
National Soccer League (Australia) players
Marquee players (A-League Men)
2006 FIFA World Cup players
2007 AFC Asian Cup players
Footballers at the 2008 Summer Olympics
2010 FIFA World Cup players
2014 FIFA World Cup players
2015 AFC Asian Cup players
2017 FIFA Confederations Cup players
2018 FIFA World Cup players
2019 AFC Asian Cup players
Scottish Professional Football League players
Expatriate footballers in China
Expatriate footballers in Japan
Expatriate footballers in the United Arab Emirates
Expatriate footballers in Scotland
Expatriate footballers in England
Australian expatriate sportspeople in China
Australian expatriate sportspeople in England
Australian expatriate sportspeople in Japan
Australian expatriate sportspeople in Scotland
Australian expatriate sportspeople in the United Arab Emirates
Australian expatriate sportspeople in Saudi Arabia